Non-interference may refer to:

Noninterference (novel), by Harry Turtledove
Non-interference (security), a security policy model
Opposition in international relations to intervention in other countries' Westphalian sovereignty
 Noninterference directive, better known as Prime Directive, a policy in the Star Trek universe
 Non-interventionism, foreign policy that holds that political rulers should avoid interfering in the affairs of foreign nations relations but still retain diplomacy and trade, while avoiding wars unless related to direct self-defense.

See also 
 Interference (disambiguation)
 No Interference, album by Dysrhythmia